Ellen Land-Weber (born 1943) is an American photographer and author.

In 2000 she authored the book To Save a Life: Stories of Jewish Rescue.

Her work is included in the collections of the National Gallery of Canada and the Smithsonian American Art Museum. and numerous permanent collections.

Exhibited widely since the 1970s, she was known for working with alternative technologies such as the first color copy machine, 3M Color in Color, (solo exhibition at San Francisco Museum of Modern Art, 1978).

She was one of 24 photographers commissioned by the Seagram company to document every county courthouse for the US Bicentennial,  now housed in the U.S. Library of Congress Seagram County Courthouse.

As a member of the photography collective “Water in the West” she has been documenting the Arcata Marsh and Wildlife Refuge since the 1990s, archived at the Center for Creative Photography, University of Arizona, Tucson Arizona.

She has been the recipient of numerous Artists Grants from the Polaroid Corporation, working in every format from SX70 to 20x24.

She held leadership positions in the Society for Photographic Education, Treasurer 1979–1981, Secretary 1981–1983.

Works, permanent collections and exhibitions

Works 

The Passionate Collector, 1980 
To Save a Life: Stories of Holocaust Rescue, University of Illinois Press, 2000 
Percy Faith Corazon album cover photo collage by Ellen Land-Weber 
Herb Pedersen Southwest album cover photo by Ellen Land-Weber 
High Voltage (4) High Voltage album cover photo by Ellen Land-Weber

Permanent collections 

U.S. Library of Congress Seagram County Courthouse Archive 
Smithsonian American Art Museum 
Norton Simon Museum, Pasadena, California 
The Museum of Fine Arts, Houston, Texas 
The Art Institute of Chicago 
George Eastman Museum, Rochester, NY 
Visual Studies Workshop, Rochester, New York 
National Gallery of Canada

Solo exhibitions 

 Sheldon Museum of Art, Lincoln, Nebraska, 1975 
 San Francisco Museum of Modern Art, 1978 
 University Museum and Galleries, California State University Long Beach, 1982
 Todd Madigan Gallery, CSU Bakersfield, California, 1992
 Richard J. Daley Center, Chicago, Illinois, 1998
 Morris Graves Museum of Art, Eureka California, 2001

Group exhibitions 

 SF Camerawork gallery Archives 1977 "The Instant Image"  Ellen Land-Weber, Ted Orland and Barbara Astman 
 FotoFest 2004, Houston Texas March 12-April 12, 2004 
 Humboldt State University First Street Gallery Village of Old Believer's, Siberia, 2008 
 Humboldt State University Third Street Gallery, "A Moment in Time" October 2013

Awards 

 National Endowment for the Arts Individual Artist Grants: 1975, 1979, 1982
 Fulbright Senior Fellowship 1993
 Humboldt State University Scholar of the Year 2005

Press 

 The Passionate Collector, Art Forum, December 1980 
 Ellen Land-Weber in "Proof: Los Angeles Art and the Photograph 1960–1980", text by Charles Desmarais, published by Fellows of Contemporary Art, Los Angeles, 1992 
 "Images of Altruism" by Bob Doran, North Coast Journal Weekly, October 5, 2000 
 “Visions: An afternoon with Ellen Land-Weber” , by Bob Doran, North Coast Journal Weekly, February 3, 2005 
 Scotia Past: A trip back in time to a company town at the crossroads, Ellen Land-Weber, North Coast Journal Weekly, March 22, 2007 
 "Altruistic Personality? How Rescue in the Holocaust Was Not Entirely Selfless," 
 Melanie Parker, on Ellen Land-Weber’s “To Save A Life,” March 14, 2008
 "Facing Others: Portraits from New Guinea" at F Street Gallery, Times Standard, Eureka California May 31, 2018 
 "Scotia Past" illustrated cover story by Ellen Land-Weber, about the company town Scotia, published in North Coast Journal of Politics, People and Art: March 22–28, 2007 vol. 18, No.13

References

21st-century Canadian women artists
21st-century Canadian photographers
20th-century Canadian women artists
20th-century Canadian photographers
1943 births
Living people
People from Rochester, New York